Rebecca M. Jordan-Young (born 1963), is an American feminist scientist and gender studies scholar. Her research focuses on social medical science, sex, gender, sexuality, and epidemiology.  She is an Associate Professor of Women’s, Gender, and Sexuality Studies at Barnard College.

Life and career
Jordan-Young completed her undergraduate work at Bryn Mawr College, receiving her bachelor's degree in political science. She earned her master's degree and Ph.D. from Columbia University.

Jordan-Young was a principal investigator and deputy director of the Social Theory Core at the Center for Drug Use and HIV Research of the National Development and Research Institutes. She has served as a health disparities scholar sponsored by the National Institutes of Health. In 2008, Jordan-Young was a visiting scholar in cognitive neuroscience at the International School for Advanced Studies.

She is the author of Brain Storm: The Flaws in the Science of Sex Differences, a critical analysis of scientific research supporting the theory that psychological sex differences in humans are "hard-wired" into the brain. Jordan-Young argues that studies of “human brain organization theory,” fail to meet scientific standards.

In Out of Bounds? A Critique of the New Policies on Hyperandrogenism in Elite Female Athletes, a collaborative article with Katrina Karkazis, Georgiann Davis, and Silvia Camporesi, published in 2012 in the American Journal of Bioethics, the authors argue that a new sex testing policy by the International Association of Athletics Federations aimed at intersex women athletes will not protect against breaches of privacy, will require athletes to undergo unnecessary treatment in order to compete, and will intensify "gender policing". They recommend that athletes be able to compete in accordance with their legal gender.

In 2016, Jordan-Young was awarded a Guggenheim Fellowship to work on a book on testosterone, "T: The Unauthorized Biography", with co-author Katrina Karkazis.

Selected bibliography

Books

Journals
 
 
 
 
See also:

Editorials

References

External links
Rebecca Jordan-Young via Barnard College

Living people
1963 births
Human sex difference researchers
Intersex and medicine